Dimitrios Konstantinidis (born 13 March 1933) is a Greek middle-distance runner. He competed in the men's 800 metres at the 1956 Summer Olympics.

References

1933 births
Living people
Athletes (track and field) at the 1956 Summer Olympics
Greek male middle-distance runners
Olympic athletes of Greece
Place of birth missing (living people)
20th-century Greek people